The 2018 Tour Challenge was held from November 6 to 11 at the Tournament Centre in Thunder Bay, Ontario. This was the third Grand Slam of the 2018–19 curling season.

In the men's Tier 1 competition, Brad Jacobs defeated Brendan Bottcher in the final 6–5. Team Bottcher was playing in their first Grand Slam final. In Tier 2, Kirk Muyres defeated Scott McDonald's team in the final to secure a spot in the 2019 Canadian Open.

The women's Tier 1 competition saw Rachel Homan defeat Tracy Fleury 8–4. In the Tier 2 final, Elena Stern beat Sayaka Yoshimura 6–5, qualifying for the 2019 Canadian Open.

Qualification

The Tour Challenge consists of two tiers of 15 teams. For Tier 1, the top 15 teams on the World Curling Tour's Order of Merit rankings as of October 1, 2018. If any teams declined, the next highest team was invited until the field of 15 teams was complete. For Tier 2, the next 10 teams on the OOM rankings are invited. The final 5 teams in Tier 2 are filled by regional invitations extended by the Grand Slam of Curling.

Men
Top Order of Merit men's teams as of October 1:
 Brad Gushue
 Niklas Edin
 Kevin Koe
 Bruce Mouat
 Brad Jacobs
 Reid Carruthers
 John Epping
 Jason Gunnlaugson
 Peter de Cruz
 Glenn Howard
 Steffen Walstad
 Brendan Bottcher
 John Shuster
 Thomas Ulsrud
 Rich Ruohonen
 Ross Paterson
 Yannick Schwaller
 Matt Dunstone
 Braden Calvert

Women
Top Order of Merit women's teams as of October 1:
 Anna Hasselborg
 Jennifer Jones
 Rachel Homan
 Tracy Fleury
 Laura Walker
 Eve Muirhead
 Jamie Sinclair
 Nina Roth
 Silvana Tirinzoni
 Satsuki Fujisawa
 Kim Eun-jung
 Kerri Einarson
 Darcy Robertson
 Casey Scheidegger
 Chelsea Carey
 Isabella Wranå
 Allison Flaxey
 Anna Sidorova
 Cory Christensen
 Krista McCarville

Men

Tier 1

Teams

Round-robin standings

Round-robin results
All draw times are listed in Eastern Daylight time (UTC-4).

Draw 1
Tuesday, November 6, 7:00 pm

Draw 2
Wednesday, November 7, 8:00 am

Draw 3
Wednesday, November 7, 11:30 am

Draw 4
Wednesday, November 7, 3:00 pm

Draw 5
Wednesday, November 7, 7:00 pm

Draw 6
Thursday, November 8, 8:00 am

Draw 7
Thursday, November 8, 11:30 am

Draw 8
Thursday, November 8, 3:00 pm

Draw 9
Thursday, November 8, 7:00 pm

Draw 10
Friday, November 9, 8:00 am

Draw 11
Friday, November 9, 11:30 am

Draw 12
Friday, November 9, 3:00 pm

Draw 13
Friday, November 9, 7:00 pm

Tiebreaker
Saturday, November 10, 8:30 am

Playoffs

Quarterfinals
Saturday, November 10, 4:00 pm

Semifinals
Saturday, November 10, 8:00 pm

Final
Sunday, November 11, 4:00 pm

Tier 2

Round-robin standings

Tiebreakers
 Muirhead 5-2 Stopera 
 van Dorp 7-4 Lyburn

Playoffs

Women

Tier 1

Teams

Round-robin standings

Round-robin results
All draw times are listed in Eastern Daylight time (UTC-4).

Draw 1
Tuesday, November 6, 7:00 pm

Draw 2
Wednesday, November 7, 8:00 am

Draw 3
Wednesday, November 7, 11:30 am

Draw 4
Wednesday, November 7, 3:00 pm

Draw 5
Wednesday, November 7, 7:00 pm

Draw 6
Thursday, November 8, 8:00 am

Draw 7
Thursday, November 8, 11:30 am

Draw 8
Thursday, November 8, 3:00 pm

Draw 9
Thursday, November 8, 7:00 pm

Draw 10
Friday, November 9, 8:00 am

Draw 11
Friday, November 9, 11:30 am

Draw 12
Friday, November 9, 3:00 pm

Playoffs

Quarterfinals
Saturday, November 10, 12:00 pm

Semifinals
Saturday, November 10, 8:00 pm

Final
Sunday, November 11, 12:00 pm

Tier 2

Round-robin standings

Tiebreakers
 Froud 2-8 Rocque 
 Streifel 10-3 Brunton 
 Harrison 4-7 Tippin

Playoffs

References

External links

November 2018 sports events in Canada
2018 in Canadian curling
Sports competitions in Thunder Bay
Curling in Northern Ontario
2018 in Ontario
2018